August 11 - Eastern Orthodox liturgical calendar - August 13

All fixed commemorations below are observed on August 25 by Orthodox Churches on the Old Calendar.

For August 12, Orthodox Churches on the Old Calendar commemorate the Saints listed on July 30.

Feasts

 Afterfeast of the Transfiguration of Our Lord, God, and Savior Jesus Christ.

Saints

 Hieromartyr Alexander of Comana, Bishop of Comana (3rd century)
 Martyrs Pamphilus and Capito, by the sword (3rd century)
 Martyrs Anicetus and Photius, and others, of Nicomedia (288)
 Holy 12 soldier-martyrs of Crete, by the sword.
 Venerable Pallamon of Egypt (c. 323), instructor of St. Pachomius the Great.
 Venerable Saints Sergius and Stephen, peacefully.
 Venerable Castor, peacefully.

Pre-Schism Western saints

 Martyrs Hilaria, Digna, Euprepia, Eunomia, Quiriacus, Largio, Crescentian, Nimmia, Juliana and Companions (c. 304)
 Saint Euplus of Catania (304))  (see also: August 11)
 Saint Gracilian and Felicissima (c. 304)
 Saint Cassian of Benevento, Bishop of Benevento (c. 340) 
 Saint Eusebius of Milan, a Greek by birth, was Bishop of Milan in Italy for sixteen years, he opposed Eutychianism (465) 
 Saint Herculanus of Brescia, Bishop of Brescia in Italy (c. 550) 
 Saint Molaise of Devenish (Laisrén mac Nad Froích) (563)
 Saint Muredach (Murtagh, Muiredach), first Bishop of Killala and founder of Innismurray (6th century)
 Saint Seigine (Ségéne mac Fiachnaí), Abbot of Iona (652)
 Saint Porcarius, Abbot of Lérins, and 500 Companions, massacred by the Saracens (c. 732)
 Saint Jambert (Jænberht, Janbert), fourteenth Archbishop of Canterbury (792) 
 Saint Merewenna (Marwenne, Morwenna), the local saint of Marhamchurch near Bude in Cornwall. 
 Saint Ust (Justus).  The town of St Just, a few miles from Penzance in Cornwall, is named after this hermit.

Post-Schism Orthodox saints

 New Hieromartyrs of David Gareja Monastery, slain by the Dagestanis (Lekians) (1851):
 Gerontius and Serapion (hieromonks); Otar (deacon); Monk-martyrs Germanus, Bessarion, and Michael, and New Martyr Symeon.

New martyrs and confessors

 New Hieromartyrs of the Belogorsk St. Nicholas Monastery (Perm) (1918-1919):
 Barlaam (Konoplev), Archimandrite, 
 Anthony (Arapov), Abbot, 
 Sergius (Vershinin), Elijah (Popov), Vyacheslav (Kosozhilin), Ioasaph (Sabintsev), and John (Novoselov), Hieromonks;
 Micah (Podkorytov), Bessarion (Okulov), Euthymius (Korotkov), and Matthew (Bannikov), Hierodeacons; 
 New Monk-martyrs: Euthymius, Barnabas, Demetrius, Sabbas, Hermogenes, Arcadius, and Marcellus;
 Martyred novices: John, Jacob, Peter, Jacob, Alexander, Theodore, Peter, Sergius, and Alexis.
 New Hieromartyr Basil Infantiev, Priest (1918)
 New Hieromartyrs Leonidas Biryukovich, John Nikolsky, and Nicholas Dobroumov, Priests (1937)
 New Martyr Eudocia Safronova (1938)

Other commemorations

 Translation of relics of St. Eadwold of Cerne (Edwold) (c. 900), hermit of Cerne.

Icon gallery

Notes

References

Sources
 August 12 / August 25. Orthodox Calendar (PRAVOSLAVIE.RU).
 August 25 / August 12. HOLY TRINITY RUSSIAN ORTHODOX CHURCH (A parish of the Patriarchate of Moscow).
 August 12. OCA - The Lives of the Saints.
 The Autonomous Orthodox Metropolia of Western Europe and the Americas (ROCOR). St. Hilarion Calendar of Saints for the year of our Lord 2004. St. Hilarion Press (Austin, TX). p. 59.
 Menologion: The Twelfth Day of the Month of August. Orthodoxy in China.
 August 12. Latin Saints of the Orthodox Patriarchate of Rome.
 The Roman Martyrology. Transl. by the Archbishop of Baltimore. Last Edition, According to the Copy Printed at Rome in 1914. Revised Edition, with the Imprimatur of His Eminence Cardinal Gibbons. Baltimore: John Murphy Company, 1916. pp. 240-241.
 Rev. Richard Stanton. A Menology of England and Wales, or, Brief Memorials of the Ancient British and English Saints Arranged According to the Calendar, Together with the Martyrs of the 16th and 17th Centuries. London: Burns & Oates, 1892. pp. 389-391.

 Greek Sources
 Great Synaxaristes:  12 ΑΥΓΟΥΣΤΟΥ. ΜΕΓΑΣ ΣΥΝΑΞΑΡΙΣΤΗΣ.
  Συναξαριστής. 12 Αυγούστου. ECCLESIA.GR. (H ΕΚΚΛΗΣΙΑ ΤΗΣ ΕΛΛΑΔΟΣ).

 Russian Sources
  25 августа (12 августа). Православная Энциклопедия под редакцией Патриарха Московского и всея Руси Кирилла (электронная версия). (Orthodox Encyclopedia - Pravenc.ru).

August in the Eastern Orthodox calendar